
Year 215 BC was a year of the pre-Julian Roman calendar. At the time it was known as the Year of the Consulship of Albinus/Marcellus/Verrucosus and Gracchus (or, less frequently, year 539 Ab urbe condita). The denomination 215 BC for this year has been used since the early medieval period, when the Anno Domini calendar era became the prevalent method in Europe for naming years.

Events 
 By place 
 Carthage 
 The Carthaginians fail to recapture Sardinia.

 Spain 
 The Carthaginian general, Hannibal, is denied any reinforcements from Spain for his forces now based in Italy by the activities of the Roman general Publius Cornelius Scipio and his brother Gnaeus Cornelius Scipio Calvus, who, in a battle at Dertosa near the Ebro River effectively stop the Carthaginian general, Hasdrubal's attempt to break through to Italy.

 Roman Republic 
 The Roman law, Lex Oppia, is instituted by Gaius Oppius, a tribune of the plebs during the consulship of Quintus Fabius Maximus Verrucosus and Tiberius Sempronius Gracchus. The Lex Oppia is the first of a series of sumptuary laws introduced in Rome. It not only restricts women's wealth, but also their displaying it.
 The Roman general, Marcus Claudius Marcellus, again repulses an attack by Hannibal on the city of Nola.
 Hannibal's forces occupy the cities of Heraclea and Thurii. However, Hannibal is unable to prevent the Romans from besieging Capua.

 Greece 
 Philip V of Macedon and Hannibal negotiate an alliance under which they pledge mutual support and defence. Specifically, they agree to support each other against Rome, and that Hannibal shall have the right to make peace with Rome, but that any peace would include Philip and that Rome would be forced to give up control of Corcyra, Apollonia, Epidamnus, Pharos, Dimale, Parthini and Atintania and to restore to Demetrius of Pharos all his lands currently controlled by Rome.

 Seleucid Empire 
 The Seleucid king, Antiochus III, crosses the Taurus Mountains, uniting his forces with Attalus of Pergamum and, in one campaign, deprives his rebel general, Achaeus, of all his dominions and takes Sardis (with the exception of the citadel).

China 
 Emperor Qin Shi Huang orders the construction of his mausoleum to begin, including the famous Terracotta Army.
 In what is claimed to be a preemptive strike, Qin forces under Meng Tian drive the Xiongnu and other northern peoples from their homeland on the Ordos Plateau.

Births 
 Antiochus IV Epiphanes, king of the Seleucid Empire (d. 164 BC) (approximate date)

Deaths 
 Apollonius of Rhodes, Greek author (b. 295 BC)
 Hiero II, tyrant of Syracuse from 270 BC (b. c. 308 BC)
 Hieronymus, grandson of Hiero II of Syracuse and tyrant (assassinated) (b. c. 231 BC)
 Emperor Kōrei of Japan, according to legend.

References